Rahul Gupta (born 1970 or 1971) is an American physician from the state of West Virginia. He is the director of the Office of National Drug Control Policy, and the first physician to serve in the role.

Early life
Gupta was born in India and raised in a suburb of Washington, D.C. His father is a diplomat. Gupta earned his Doctor of Medicine from the University College of Medical Sciences of Delhi University. He earned a Master of Public Health from the University of Alabama at Birmingham (UAB). He worked as an assistant professor of medicine at Meharry Medical College and at UAB.

Medical career
Gupta ran the Kanawha-Charleston Health Department from 2009 to 2014. He became the director of the West Virginia Bureau of Public Health in 2015, and focused on reducing overdose deaths from the opioid epidemic. He left the role in 2018 to become the chief medical officer of the March of Dimes.

Biden administration
Gupta was the lead member of the 2020 presidential transition of Joe Biden for the Office of National Drug Control Policy (ONDCP). Biden nominated him to be director of the ONDCP on July 13, 2021. His nomination was confirmed by the United States Senate on October 28, and he was sworn into office on November 18.

Upon taking office, Gupta noted that addressing “the overdose epidemic that has claimed more than 100,000 lives between April 2020 and April 2021” would be his priority.

References

1970s births
Biden administration personnel
Directors of the Office of National Drug Control Policy
Living people
University of Alabama at Birmingham alumni
Delhi University alumni
Year of birth uncertain
People from Charleston, West Virginia
Physicians from West Virginia
American physicians of Indian descent
Indian emigrants to the United States